The Searunner 25 is a trimaran sailboat from the 1960s designed by Jim Brown. It is the smallest boat in the Searunner series.

See also
List of multihulls
Jim Brown
Searunner 31
Searunner 34
Searunner 37
Searunner 40

References

Trimarans